The Marfa Ridge is a geographical ridge in Northwest Malta. The ridge is mostly known for hiking trips. On the eastern tip of the ridge, Maltese farmland is very common.

References

Geography of Malta
Ridges in Malta